Jalavihar is a waterpark located in Hyderabad, Telangana, (India) within an area of about . Located beside Sanjeevaiah Park and along the Hussain Sagar lake, the park was inaugurated on 20 May 2007.

Background 

Although the land was allotted by the local government headed by N. Chandrababu Naidu in 2000, the work was stalled because of problems with land encroachment and ownership. Further to this, a probe was initiated by the local government on the method of allocation of projects. India's apex court gave the go ahead to the project in mid-2006 on the basis of sanction of the local pollution control board and the regional high court.

Because of the profitability of public-private partnership model such as this one, the local government proposed to continue the trend in 2010.

Facilities 
Jalavihar Water Park and Banquets is a popular family entertainment and event venue located in Hyderabad, India. The water park offers a wide range of wet and dry rides, attractions, and amenities for visitors of all ages.

The water park features a variety of rides such as Body slide, twister slide, mat ride, single tube ride, double tube ride, pendulum, and a ladies and kids pool with slides and activities. The park also has a wave pool, DJ rain dance and other attractions for visitors to enjoy. Jalavihar Water Park is known for its clean, safe and friendly environment, making it a perfect destination for families and friends to spend the day together.

In addition to the water park, Jalavihar also features banquets halls, which are perfect for hosting events such as weddings, corporate events, and other special occasions. The banquets halls are professionally managed, with lush green surroundings, superior service and panoramic views of lake with Buddha Statue, Birla Mandir and Biggest Indian Flag. The banquets halls are easily accessible from any part of the twin cities, have ample car parking and are centrally located. Jalavihar banquet venues have got easy access from any part of twin cities.

Jalavihar is committed to providing the safest, cleanest, and most unforgettable water park and event experience for the entire family. In fact, it has received the 1st Prize from the Department of horticulture every year since 2007. Throughout the year, Jalavihar shares reasonable prices with

References

External links
 Jalavihar Photographs, 2013

Water parks in India
2007 establishments in Andhra Pradesh
Amusement parks in Hyderabad, India
Amusement parks opened in 2007